The Cave Monastery of İnceğiz is a cave monastery formed by carving a rocky cliff located in İnceğiz village of Çatalca district in Istanbul Province, northwestern Turkey.

The cave monastery is situated at Karasu Valley overlooking Karasu Creek. It is a four-story apartment building of rock-cut architecture. The structure was cut out in limestone formation, which has a suitable lithography for easy forming. The site in the cliff is accessible by a wooden staircase on the trail. The openings of the cliff dwelling are barred by chains.

Initially, the four stories were interconnected. However, due to erosion and earthquakes, some parts of the structure collapsed, and so some of the connections are broken. The first floor contains three rooms. The staircase inside the structure leading from the first floor to the upper floors has broken down while only few steps below the second floor are intact. The second floor is accessible from outside. The third floor contains three rooms including two large ones. On the fourth floor, there is a residence room of size  and a chapel.

The cave monastery has been known since the 1950s. It is assumed that it was heavily used by Christians for a while. It is likely that the place was inhabited from the 4th century until the end of the 12th century, and was used as a Byzantine monastery. However, archaeological excavations carried out between 1992 and 1995 revealed that the area was settled even much earlier.

References

Cave monasteries
Greek Orthodox monasteries in Turkey
Incegiz
Cliffs of Turkey
Archaeological sites in the Marmara Region
Buildings and structures in Istanbul Province
Tourist attractions in Istanbul Province
Çatalca